Burt Wolf (Burton Wolf), born 1938, is an American journalist, writer, entrepreneur, chef, and TV producer. He is the host and author of nine internationally syndicated television series that deal with cultural history, travel and gastronomy, including Travels & Traditions.

Biography
Burt Wolf was born in New York City, in 1938, and as a boy helped out at his grandmother's housewares store in the Bronx. In a 1993 interview with the Los Angeles Times, Wolf stated, "My grandmother owned a cooking equipment store," he said. "I literally grew up in the cooking business. So all the time I was training myself for food."

Wolf attended The High School of Music & Art in New York City, and New York University where he earned a BA degree in English Literature. Although he grew up thinking he would become a lawyer, Wolf supported himself by working in restaurants. He left New York University Law School to become the writer-publisher of a series of self-help books. He later sold the publishing house in 1968.

Wolf went to work for an investment banking firm in Switzerland. "The banking group was interested in investing in food companies and asked me to investigate it for them," he said. "I did a lot of research on companies that make cooking utensils. Out of that came a book called 'The Cook's Catalogue.' I edited it and did some of the writing."

Publishing 
During his 35 years as a journalist, Wolf has written or edited more than 60 books including The Cooks' Catalogue, which Time described as "the definitive book on cooking equipment." From 1979 to 1982, he wrote a weekly column syndicated by The Washington Post and in 2000 was a regular contributor to the online publication Salon.com.

Broadcasting 
Wolf began making programs about cultural history when Ted Turner invited him to report for CNN. Since 1982, Wolf has produced over 4,000 segments for Cable News Network (CNN), 800 segments for ABC (the American Broadcasting Company), 125 half-hour programs for the travel division of The Discovery Channel, and 350 half hours for Public Broadcasting. The New York Times described his programs as “the best food, travel, and cultural history shows on television.”

Wolf's programs are broadcast on public television to 90% of the television homes in the United States, then translated into Russian, Polish, Ukrainian, Romanian, Bulgarian, Mandarin and Korean and syndicated to an international audience of over 100 million. His programs have aired on public television, the Discovery Travel Network and networks in Canada, Latin America, Asia and Europe.
 
His programs have included The History and Future of Shopping, a five-part series "The History of Immigration to the United States", and a twenty-part series on sacred pilgrimage sites. He is also producing a series for public television entitled ARTCOPS.  These half-hour programs cover the $6 billion of art, jewelry and antiques stolen each year. The programs describe which objects have been stolen, why they are valuable from a historical and cultural viewpoint, how the theft took place and what the public can do to help recover the items. A central theme is the importance of these articles to the world's cultural history.

Burt Wolf: Taste of Freedom explores 13 major American holidays and gatherings: the history, folklore and rituals that have become central to those events. Special attention is paid to different ethnic groups and how they brought their own traditions to the occasions.<ref>[http://www.kqed.org/tv/programs/archive/index.jsp?pgmid=12274&date=20041101 "Burt Wolf: Taste of Freedom, KQED]</ref> 
 Travels & Traditions is a series of half-hour programs in which Wolf travels to cities around the world telling the stories of local traditions. In many locations, he also shows how foreign traditions have influenced the city he is visiting.

Wolf's marketing and public relations clients include: Procter & Gamble, eBay, ConAgra Foods, Federated Department Stores, the government of Switzerland, the government of Taiwan, the government of Norway, the government of Canada and the government of Chile.

 Product development 

He has worked on product development for a number of major companies including Procter & Gamble, General Foods, McCormick and the Origins division of Estee Lauder. He developed the Waring Commercial Blender, the first anodized aluminum pots and pans for home use, as well as major lines of bakeware and cutlery.

 Retailing 
In 1975, in partnership with Federated Department Stores, he designed and managed a group of 276 food and cooking equipment shops called "Cook's Kitchen" that were installed in Federated stores throughout the United States. The franchise was eventually extended to May Company, Marshall Field, Ives and Macy's outlets.

 Restaurants 
In 1989, Wolf designed a limited partnership investment vehicle that was used to develop a branch restaurant in Memphis for the Brennan Restaurant group of New Orleans. He was responsible for raising over $2 million for the restaurant, as well as its physical plan, menu and operating systems. The restaurant is still profitable and has had two expansions.

 Travel 
Each year, Wolf spends four months hosting European river cruises to help raise funds for public television. The group takes a trip that is based on one of his programs. They visit the same sites and travel the same route that made up one of the programs.

 Publishing 
Wolf was the founder of the Double Elephant Press. For the past forty years, Double Elephant has been publishing signed numbered portfolios containing the work of some of the world's greatest photographers including Walker Evans, Lee Friedlander, Garry Winogrand and Helmut Newton. In 2000, Wolf completed a project in which he worked with curators at New York City's Metropolitan Museum of Art on a PBS television program and companion book examining the relationship between photography and gastronomy and titled What Are They Eating In The Photograph? Awards 
Wolf was the first recipient of the James Beard Foundation Award for "Best Television Food Journalism"  and has been nominated for two cable Ace Awards and an Emmy in connection with travel and cultural history.

His reports, which are videotaped on location around the world, have won awards in the United States, Europe and Asia.

 Selected books 
 Real American Food: Restaurants, Markets, and Shops Plus Favorite Hometown Recipes by Burt Wolf and Andrew F. Smith (Hardcover - Jul 18, 2006)
 The New Cooks' Catalogue (Hardcover - Oct 24, 2000)
 Good to Eat: Flavorful recipes from one of television's best known food and travel journalists (Hardcover - April 6, 1999)		
 Gatherings and Celebrations (Hardcover - Nov 1, 1996)
 Burt Wolf's Menu Cookbook (Hardcover - Jul 1, 1995)
 Eating Well (Paperback - Jun 1, 1992)
 Burt Wolf's Table (Hardcover - Jul 1, 1994)
 What's Cooking (Hardcover - Jan 1, 1988)
 What's Cooking with TV Food Reporter Burt Wolf (Paperback - 1989)
 The Best of What's Cooking (Paperback - Jan 1, 1985)
 Where to Eat in America'' (Paperback - Oct 12, 1977)

References

External links
 Burt Wolf's website

Living people
American male journalists
Travel broadcasters
1938 births
The High School of Music & Art alumni
New York University alumni
20th-century American Jews
21st-century American Jews